An overlook is a high place where people can view scenery.

Overlook may also refer to:

Arts 
 The Overlook, a crime novel by Michael Connelly
 Overlook (album), a 2011 album by Maria Taylor
 Overlook Hotel, the setting for the Stephen King novel The Shining
 The Overlook Press, a publishing house

Buildings 
 Overlook (Little Falls, New York), a historic home
 Overlook (Martinsburg, West Virginia), a historic home
 Overlook Castle, in Asheville, North Carolina

Places 
 Overlook, Portland, Oregon, a neighborhood of Portland, Oregon
 Overlook Colony, Delaware, an unincorporated community in the United States
 Overlook Mountain, in the Catskill Mountains of New York
 Mount Overlook, in Antarctica

See also
Overwatch (disambiguation)
Overlooked (disambiguation)